Acraga brunnea is a moth of the family Dalceridae. It is found in southern Brazil. The habitat consists of subtropical moist and subtropical lower montane wet forests.

The length of the forewings is about 9 mm. The forewings are dark brown. The hindwings are also dark brown, but lighter than the forewings, especially at the costal margin. Adults are on wing in October and December.

Etymology
The species name refers to the dark brown colour.

References

Dalceridae
Moths described in 1994
Moths of South America